Elizabeth is a disused train station in Elizabeth, New Jersey. It was built by the Central Railroad of New Jersey (CNJ) in 1893. It is adjacent to NJ Transit's Elizabeth station on the Northeast Corridor. That station was built and owned by the Pennsylvania Railroad; in the era of private operation passengers could transfer between the two. The CNJ right-of-way in Elizabeth is unused, and passenger trains which served the former CNJ mainline (NJT's Raritan Valley Line service) bypass Elizabeth via the Aldene Connection on their way to Newark Penn Station. The station has been renovated and used as commercial space.

Major named trains
The station was on CNJ's main line and was also utilized by B&O and Reading Railway trains which terminated at CNJ's Jersey City terminal, where ferry service to New York was available.

Baltimore and Ohio (routes west beyond Washington, DC):
Capitol Limited, Cincinnatian, Columbian, Metropolitan Special, National Limited and others
Central Railroad of New Jersey & Reading Railway (route to Bethlehem, Allentown, Reading and Harrisburg):
Harrisburg Special and Queen of the Valley
Reading Railway (route to West Trenton and Philadelphia):
Crusader and Wall Street

Status 
The CNJ station suffered from a freight train wreck on November 4, 1972, when a boxcar derailed and pulled several other cars into the canopy. Although the buildings and freight cars were damaged, there were no injuries. The station has been listed in the New Jersey Register of Historic Places and National Register of Historic Places since 1984 and is part of the Operating Passenger Railroad Stations Thematic Resource.

There are plans to redesign the public space and create a transit plaza between the CNJ and NJT stations.  Funding was approved in 2018.

The proposed Union County Light Rail, which would have connected midtown Elizabeth with Newark Airport, would have had its western terminus at this station. The station for this line would have been referred to as Midtown to distinguish from the other stations in Elizabeth on this line. The plan has been replaced by the Union go bus expressway, a proposed bus rapid transit system between Garwood and the airport.

References 

Buildings and structures in Elizabeth, New Jersey
Former Central Railroad of New Jersey stations
Former Baltimore and Ohio Railroad stations
Railway stations on the National Register of Historic Places in New Jersey
Former railway stations in New Jersey
Transportation in Elizabeth, New Jersey
Romanesque Revival architecture in New Jersey
Railway stations in the United States opened in 1839
National Register of Historic Places in Union County, New Jersey
Repurposed railway stations in the United States
1839 establishments in New Jersey